Jules Van Bost (born 24 January 2003) is a Belgian footballer who plays as a defender for OH Leuven.

Career

Club NXT
Van Bost made his professional debut on 8 November 2020, coming on as an 88th-minute substitute for Nathan Fuakala in a 3-1 away defeat to Lommel.

OH Leuven
In May 2022, Van Bost returned to former youth club OH Leuven, joining the club's under-23 roster.

Career statistics

Club

References

External links
Jules van Bost at Goal.com

2003 births
Living people
Club NXT players
Challenger Pro League players
Belgian footballers
Association football defenders